A ricochet is a rebound, bounce or skip off a surface.

Ricochet may also refer to:

Ballistics
 Ricochet firing, firing of artillery at a low angle so as to cause the shells to skip across the ground

People
 Ricochet (musician) (born Alexander Aksyonov; 1964–2007) - Russian singer-songwriter, leader of post-punk band Obyekt Nasmeshek
 Ricochet (wrestler) (born 1988), American professional wrestler

Books and comics
 Ricochet (comics), a Marvel Comics superhero
 Ricochet (Image Comics), an Image Comics Freak Force superhero
 Ricochet (Transformers), several fictional characters in the Transformers universe
 Ricochet, a 2006 novel by Sandra Brown

Film and TV
 Ricochet (1963 film), a British crime film directed by John Moxey
 Ricochet (documentary), a music documentary about David Bowie
 Ricochet (1991 film), a crime-thriller film by Russell Mulcahy
 Ricochet (TV production company), a British independent TV production company
 "Ricochet" (Thunderbirds), the fifth episode of the second series of the British Supermarionation television series Thunderbirds

Games
 Ricochet (1989 video game), a 1989 arcade-adventure game made by Superior Software
 Ricochet (2000 video game), a multiplayer mod based on the game Half-Life
 Ricochet Lost Worlds (2004), the second Breakout clone made by Reflexive Entertainment
 Ricochet Lost Worlds: Recharged (2004), the third Breakout clone made by Reflexive Entertainment
 Ricochet Infinity (2007), the fourth Breakout clone made by Reflexive Entertainment
 Ricochet (software label), a software label owned by Mastertronic for budget re-releases of other publishers' full-price games

Internet
 Ricochet (Internet service), one of the pioneering wireless Internet service providers in the United States
Ricochet (website), an interactive conservative political news and commentary website
 Ricochet (software), an instant messaging software project
 Surf Dog Ricochet

Amusement park rides
Ricochet (Kings Dominion), a roller coaster at Kings Dominion amusement park
Ricochet (Carowinds), a roller coaster at Carowinds amusement park

Music
 Ricochet, a playing technique on bowed instruments, also known as jeté; see violin technique
 Ricochet (band), an American country music group
 Ricoshëi (pronounced "Ricochet"), a Los Angeles-based electronic music duo.

Albums
 Ricochet (Bay City Rollers album), a 1981 rock album
 Ricochet (CatHead album), the debut album by indie rock artist CatHead
 Ricochet (Jo Jo Zep & The Falcons album), 2003
 Ricochet (Nitty Gritty Dirt Band album), 1967
Ricochet (Ricochet album), this band's self-titled album
 Ricochet (Tangerine Dream album), the first live album by German electronic music group Tangerine Dream
 Ricochet, an album by Kenny

Songs
 "Ricochet" (Teresa Brewer song), a 1953 popular song written by Coleman, Darion & Gimble
 "Ricochet" (Faith No More song), the second single from the album King for a Day... Fool for a Lifetime by Faith No More
 "Ricochet!", a song by Shiny Toy Guns
 "Ricochet", a song by Anohni from the 2017 EP Paradise
 "Ricochet", a song by David Bowie from the 1983 album Let's Dance
 "Ricochet", a song by September from the 2011 album Love CPR
 "Ricochet", a song by John Fogerty
 "Ricochet", a song by Norrie Paramor and The Midland Radio Orchestra
 "Ricochet", a song by Starset from the album Vessels

See also
 
 Rikochet (disambiguation)